Khaled Khoja (born 4 July 1965) is a Syrian-Turkish politician. He was the president of the National Coalition for Syrian Revolutionary and Opposition Forces from 2015 to 2016. He was born to a Turkish family, and can speak both Turkish and Arabic. He is a Turkish citizen since 1993.

Khoja was born in Damascus in 1965. His ethnic background is Syrian Turkmen. During the rule of President Hafez al-Assad Khoja was detained twice and later studied medicine in University of Izmir, Turkey. After the Syrian uprising began in 2011, Khoja participated in founding of several opposition groups, including the Syrian National Council in October 2011. Before being elected as a National Coalition president he served as the National Coalition's representative in Turkey. Khoja resigned from the National Coalition on 25 April 2018.

References

External links
 Al Jazeera article on Khaled Khoja in 2015

1965 births
Living people
People from Damascus
Syrian National Council members
Syrian Turkmen politicians
Former National Coalition of Syrian Revolutionary and Opposition Forces members
Syrian people of Turkish descent